Davide Gardini (born 11 February 1999) is an Italian volleyball player and an outside hitter for the BYU volleyball team; he has been a member of the Italian club Club Italia Roma.

Personal life
His father is Andrea Gardini, a former volleyball player, multimedalist, three-times World Champion and head coach.

Career
He competed at 2017 CEV U19 European Championship, where his national team lost in the finale with Czech Republic. He achieved silver medal and individual award for one of the Best Outside Spikers.

Sporting achievements

National team
 2017  CEV U19 European Championship

Individually
 2017 CEV U19 European Championship - Best Outside Spiker

References

External links
 LegaVolley profile

1999 births
Living people
Italian men's volleyball players
Place of birth missing (living people)